Code2000 is a serif and pan-Unicode digital font, which includes characters and symbols from a very large range of writing systems. As of the current final version 1.171 released in 2008, Code2000 is designed and implemented by James Kass to include as much of the Unicode 5.2 standard as practical (whereas 12.0 is the currently-released version), and to support OpenType digital typography features. Code2000 supports the Basic Multilingual Plane. Code2001 was a designed to support the Supplementary Multilingual Plane, with ISO 8859-1 characters shared with Code2000 for compatibility. A third font, Code2002, was left substantially unfinished and never officially released.

Code2000 was released as shareware/donationware, with the licensing fee set at $5.00. Code2001 was released under a free software license that prohibited most derivative works but otherwise allowed free use, redistribution and  embedding. The project was abandoned in 2008, with its web domain name later taken by an Australian programming site. As of  the website was about the font again, and development continued on Code2002. However, there have been no subsequent updates.

Code2000
The names in the following list are taken directly from the Unicode standard.

Basic Latin
Latin-1 Supplement
Latin Extended – A
Latin Extended – B
IPA Extensions
Spacing Modifier Letters
Combining Diacritical Marks
Greek and Coptic
Cyrillic
Cyrillic Supplementary
Armenian
Hebrew
Arabic
Syriac
Thaana
Devanagari
Bengali
Gurmukhi
Gujarati
Oriya
Tamil
Telugu
Kannada
Malayalam
Thai
Lao
Myanmar
Georgian
Hangul Jamo
Ethiopic
Cherokee
Unified Canadian Aboriginal Syllabics
Ogham
Runic
Buhid
Khmer
Mongolian
Limbu
Tai Le
New Tai Lue
Khmer Symbols
Buginese
Balinese
Sundanese
Lepcha
Ol Chiki
Phonetic Extensions
Phonetic Extensions Supplement
Combining Diacritical Marks – Supplement
Latin Extended Additional
Greek Extended
General Punctuation
Superscripts and Subscripts
Currency Symbols
Combining Diacritical Marks for Symbols
Letter-like Symbols
Number Forms
Arrows
Mathematical Operators
Miscellaneous Technical
Control Pictures, which are graphical presentations (via different code points) for the 34 control characters in 7-bit ASCII and among the first 128 code points of Unicode, including space and delete
Optical Character Recognition
Enclosed Alphanumerics
Box Drawing
Block Elements
Geometric Shapes
Miscellaneous Symbols
Dingbats
Braille Patterns
Supplemental Arrows – B
Miscellaneous Mathematical Symbols – B
Supplemental Mathematical Operators
Miscellaneous Symbols and Arrows
Glagolitic
Latin Extended-C
Coptic
Georgian Supplement
Tifinagh
Ethiopic Extended
Cyrillic Extended-A
Supplemental Punctuation
CJK Radicals Supplement
Kangxi Radicals
Ideographic Description Characters
CJK Symbols and Punctuation
Hiragana
Katakana
Bopomofo
Hangul Compatibility Jamo
Kanbun
Bopomofo Extended
CJK Strokes
Katakana Phonetic Extensions
Enclosed CJK Letters and Months
CJK Compatibility
CJK Unified Ideographs Extension A
Yijing Hexagram Symbols
CJK Unified Ideographs
Yi Syllables
Yi Radicals
Vai
Cyrillic Extended-B
Modifier Tone Letters
Latin Extended-D
Syloti Nagri
Phags-pa
Saurashtra
Kayah Li
Rejang
Cham
Hangul Syllables
CJK Compatibility Ideographs
Alphabetic Presentation Forms
Arabic Presentation Forms – A
Variation Selectors
Vertical Forms
Combining Half Marks
CJK Compatibility Forms
Arabic Presentation Forms – B
Half-width and Full-width Forms
Specials

It also includes several scripts not officially recognized, in the Unicode Private Use Areas:

Tengwar (ConScript Unicode Registry)
Cirth (ConScript Unicode Registry)
Ewellic (ConScript Unicode Registry)
Phaistos (ConScript Unicode Registry)
Klingon (ConScript Unicode Registry)

Code2001
This is a second font in the Code 2000 family. It covers the Unicode Plane One Supplementary Multilingual Plane, mostly used for historic language scripts. The majority of these glyphs are not found in Code 2000.

Code2001 includes support for:
ISO-8859-1 characters
Linear B
Aegean numbers
Phaistos
Old Italic
Gothic
Ugaritic
Old Persian Cuneiform
Deseret
Shavian script
Osmanya
Cypriot syllabary
Phoenician
Byzantine Musical Symbols
Musical Symbols
Tài Xuán Jīng Symbols
Counting Rod Numerals
Mathematical Alphanumeric Symbols (including the ones in the Letter-like Symbols block)
Domino Tiles

As the font ceased updating in 2008, it does not include the emoji, added to Unicode in version 6.0, that make up the best-known and most commonly used characters in the set.
This font covers a few characters in the Unicode Plane Two Supplementary Ideographic Plane. It also covers a few tags in Unicode Plane Fourteen Supplementary Special-purpose Plane.

Also included are:
Tengwar
Cirth
Pollard script
The first two are not yet approved for use in Unicode, and therefore are encoded in the Plane Fifteen Private Use Area and the Basic Multilingual Plane. (As noted above, the former two are also available in Code2000.) The Pollard Script is in Unicode now, so its spot is deprecated.

Code2002
This is a third font in the Code 2000 family. The glyphs in this font are not part of either Code 2000 or Code 2001.

This font partially covers the Unicode Plane Two Supplementary Ideographic Plane. This is a Supplementary Plane used for Chinese, Japanese, and Korean ideographs. Roughly 40% of Plane Two is included in this font.

See also
 Unicode typeface
 Free software Unicode typefaces
 Unicode

Other well-known Unicode fonts include:
 Arial Unicode MS
 Lucida Sans Unicode
 TITUS Cyberbit Basic
 TITUS Cyberbit Unicode
 Free UCS Outline Fonts

References

External links
 Official website of the font

Unicode typefaces
IPA typefaces